Dumfries Saints RFC is a rugby union club based in Dumfries, Scotland. The team currently plays in Scottish National League Division Two, the third tier of Scottish club rugby.

History
The first rugby club from Dumfries to be admitted to the SRU was Dumfries Rangers in 1876–77. The club re-emerged in 1901 as Dumfries (without the 'Rangers') and after a lapse was re-admitted to the SRU in 1923 as Dumfries RFC.

The club played at Downfield until 1939 and then at Marchfield and Summerhill. Then came a major turning point in 1953 when the club negotiated a deal to play at Park Farm.

The name Dumfries Saints was adopted to reflect the link to Saint Michael and the town crest which has always been used by the club.

Dumfries Sevens

The club run the Dumfries Sevens. Teams play for the Dumfries Challenge Cup.

Honours

 Scottish National League Division Three
 Champions (1): 2016-17
 Newton Stewart Sevens
 Champions (1): 2009
 Irvine Sevens
 Champions (1): 1981
 Cumnock Sevens
 Champions (1): 1989
 Stewartry Sevens
 Champions (7): 1979, 1980, 1983, 1985, 1986, 1987, 1990
 Wigtownshire Sevens
 Champions (8): 1959, 1961, 1962, 1963, 1964, 1980, 1982, 2015

Notable former players

Scotland internationalists

The following former Dumfries Saints players have represented Scotland at full international level.

External links
 Official site

References 

Rugby union in Dumfries and Galloway
Scottish rugby union teams
Sport in Dumfries